Qaleh-ye Taqi (also Romanized as Qal‘eh-ye Taqī; also known as Qal‘eh-ye Ra’īs Taqī) is a village in Howmeh Rural District, in the Central District of Behbahan County, Khuzestan Province, Iran. At the 2006 census, its population was 50, in 12 families.

References 

Populated places in Behbahan County